The Federal University of Health Sciences of Porto Alegre (UFCSPA; formerly known as , FFFCMPA; and ) is a federal institution of higher education and research on health sciences located in Porto Alegre, Brazil.

Founded in 1961, UFCSPA has today 15 degrees: Biomedicine, Medicine, Nursing, Nutrition, Physiotherapy, Psychology, Pharmacy, Toxicology, Gastronomy, Medical Physics, Health Management, Medical Chemistry, Biomedical Informatics, Food Technology and Speech therapy.

UFCSPA is linked to Santa Casa de Misericordia Hospital, a major hospital in Latin America.

Structure
The UFCSPA has a main building of 6 floors and the Center for Research and Post-Graduate Professor Heitor Cirne Lima. In its facilities, besides various laboratories, the university has a library (with broadband internet access and terminals for individual and group study), amphitheaters, conference room, art room, cafeteria, restaurant and chapel. It has parking spaces for employees, teachers and students. Currently an enclosed building is being constructed within the university and will house new laboratories and classrooms.

The university has an area of 9,456.84 m2, and the built part is 13,121.09 m2.

Notable alumni
Ciro de Quadros - physician

See also
Brazil University Rankings
Universities and Higher Education in Brazil
Santa Casa Hospital Porto Alegre

References

External links

  

Universities and colleges in Porto Alegre
Medical schools in Brazil
Educational institutions established in 1961
1961 establishments in Brazil
Federal universities of Brazil